Col Jakes Jacobs was a South African Army officer from the artillery.

Military career 

He joined the South African Defence Force  and graduated from the South African Military Academy. He saw active service in Angola during Operation Savannah in 1975-76. Chief Instructor Gunnery at School of Artillery during the early eighties. He was appointed as OC School of Artillery from 1987 to 1991. He served as Director of Artillery from 1991-1995. He left the SANDF in 1995.

Honours and awards

Medals

Proficiency badges

References 

South African military officers
Living people
Year of birth missing (living people)
Afrikaner people
South African people of Dutch descent
Stellenbosch University alumni
South African military personnel of the Border War